Novaliches is a place that forms the northern areas of Quezon City, and encompasses the whole area of North Caloocan.

Etymology

The name Novaliches came from the name of the small village of Novaliches in the town of Jérica, Spain. It was awarded to General Manuel Pavía y Lacy, who served as a Governor-General of the Philippines. The child Queen Isabella II bestowed on him the title "Marquez of Novaliches" for defending her against her uncle Don Carlos María Isidro Benito de Borbón, who claimed the throne of Spain which resulted in the First Carlist War.

History

On February 2, 1854, General Manuel Pavía y Lacy was sent to Manila to serve as the Governor-General of the Philippines. His task was to establish a penal colony where prisoners were given lands to develop in exchange for their freedom. The colony was given the name Hacienda Tala, and it eventually grew into a larger community. In the same year, the Alcalde Mayor (equivalient to present-day Governor) of Bulacan petitioned to the Spanish government to incorporate the haciendas of Malinta, Piedad, and Tala into a new town. The town was to be named "Novaliches" from the title "Marquis of Novaliches" of Manuel Pavía y Lacy, which was recently recalled to Spain.

On September 22, 1855, Novaliches was created as a municipality of Bulacan. Three years later, it was transferred to the Province of Tondo (later renamed Manila in 1859) until 1901, when the town was transferred again to the newly created Rizal Province during the American regime. The US Government enacted a reorganization of local government units as part of economic reforms, and Novaliches was absorbed by the neighboring town of Caloocan on October 12, 1903, by virtue of Act No. 942 of the Philippine Commission. During World War II, Caloocan became part of the City of Greater Manila from 1942 to 1945.

In July 1948, Republic Act No. 333 was signed, making Quezon City as the Capital City of the Philippines, replacing Manila. This necessitated the expansion of Quezon City northward, beyond the La Mesa Watershed Reservation, and encompassing half of the former town. The other half, now known as North Caloocan, remains with Caloocan, which became a city in 1962. The division of Novaliches caused Caloocan to be divided into two parts.

On February 23, 1998, President Fidel V. Ramos signed Republic Act No. 8535, which would make Novaliches into its own city. 15 barangays were to be taken out from Quezon City to form the proposed new city. However, it lost in the plebiscite held in the whole of Quezon City on October 23, 1999. At present, the part of Novaliches belonging to Quezon City is divided into two Congressional Districts, which represents it in the Lower House of the Congress of the Philippines.

Barangays

Education

The Main Campus of Quezon City University is located on San Bartolome, along Quirino Highway.

In popular culture

 On the debut album of Filipino rock band Rocksteddy entitled Tsubtsatagilidakeyn, there is a song called "Super Nova" which pays homage to the district. The song was re-recorded in their 2017 Ang Album Na May Pinakamahabang Pamagat and was re-titled as "Supernovaliches (Re-Recorded)".

References

 

Quezon City
Caloocan
Populated places established in 1855